This is a list of tennis players who have represented the Finland Davis Cup team in an official Davis Cup match. Finland have taken part in the competition since 1928.

Players

References

Lists of Davis Cup tennis players
Tennis in Finland